"Kansas City Lights" is a song written by Kye Fleming and Dennis Morgan, and recorded by American country music artist Steve Wariner.  It was released in March 1982 as the fourth single from Wariner's self-titled debut album.  The song reached #15 on the US Billboard Hot Country Singles & Tracks chart.

Chart performance

References

1982 singles
1982 songs
Steve Wariner songs
Songs written by Kye Fleming
Songs written by Dennis Morgan (songwriter)
Song recordings produced by Tom Collins (record producer)
RCA Records singles
Songs about Kansas